Adnan Menderes Stadium is a stadium located in Aydın, Turkey. It is currently the home of Aydınspor 1923.

Sports venues in Aydın
Adnan Menderes